Virginia Fortune Ogilvy, Countess of Airlie, DCVO (née Ryan; born February 9, 1933) is a former Lady of the Bedchamber to Queen Elizabeth II.

Early life
Lady Airlie was born in Newport, New Jersey, the daughter of John Barry Ryan Jr., and Margaret Kahn. Her mother was the daughter of German-American financier Otto Kahn, and her father was the grandson of Thomas Fortune Ryan.

Lady Airlie was a Lady of the Bedchamber from 1973, until the Queen's death in September 2022. She was appointed a Dame Commander of the Royal Victorian Order (DCVO) in 1995.

Lady Airlie's 70th birthday was celebrated with a dinner at the private member's nightclub Annabel's in Mayfair to which the Queen attended. It is thought to be the only occasion on which the Queen had visited a nightclub since she was married.

As Lady of the Bedchamber she was a senior lady-in-waiting, and attended to the Queen on major occasions and overseas tours. In May 2007, she accompanied the Queen on her trip to the United States to commemorate the 400th anniversary of England's first American settlement at Jamestown, Virginia. On May 7, 2007, she attended a state dinner at the White House, hosted by President George W. Bush and First Lady Laura Bush.

Personal life
On October 23, 1952, she married David Ogilvy, Lord Ogilvy, who in 1968 became the Earl of Airlie. With her husband, Lady Airlie has six children:
 Lady Doune Mabell Ogilvy (b. August 13, 1953); served as a bridesmaid at the wedding of her uncle Angus Ogilvy and Princess Alexandra of Kent. Lady Doune married Sir Hereward Charles Wake, 15th Bt. on April 16, 1977; they had four children, and divorced in July 1995.
 Lady Jane Fortune Margaret Ogilvy (b. June 24, 1955); married François Nairac on 30 August 1980. The couple have two daughters.
 David John Ogilvy, Lord Ogilvy (b. March 9, 1958); served as a page boy at the wedding of his uncle Angus Ogilvy and Princess Alexandra. Lord Ogilvy married, firstly, in 1981, Hon. Geraldine Harmsworth, daughter of Vere Harmsworth, 3rd Viscount Rothermere. They had a daughter before divorcing in 1990. Lord Ogilvy married, secondly, in 1991, Tarka Kings, with whom he has three children. 
 Hon. Bruce Patrick Mark Ogilvy (b. April 7, 1959)
 Lady Elizabeth Clementine Ogilvy (b. June 4, 1965); married Jonathan Baring, with whom she has one issue.
 Hon. Patrick Alexander Ogilvy (b. March 24, 1971);

Further reading
 Williams, Iain Cameron. The KAHNS of Fifth Avenue: the Crazy Rhythm of Otto Hermann Kahn and the Kahn Family, 2022, iwp publishing,  - biography of Virginia Ogilvy's grandfather Otto Hermann Kahn and her uncle Roger Wolfe Kahn.

References

External links
 Profile, thePeerage.com; accessed 20 July 2015.

1933 births
Living people
Ladies of the Bedchamber
Naturalised citizens of the United Kingdom
Scottish countesses
Dames Commander of the Royal Victorian Order
American people of German-Jewish descent
British people of German-Jewish descent
British people of American-Jewish descent
American emigrants to England